Phosphoethanolamine/phosphocholine phosphatase (EC 3.1.3.75, PHOSPHO1, 3X11A; systematic name phosphoethanolamine phosphohydrolase) is an enzyme highly expressed in mineralizing cells . This enzyme is implicated in bone and cartilage formation and catalyses the following chemical reactions:

 (1) O-phosphoethanolamine + H2O  ethanolamine + phosphate
 (2) phosphocholine + H2O  choline + phosphate

The enzyme is a member of the haloacid dehalogenase superfamily. Like other members of this superfamily it requires a metal ion for catalysis, which is usually Mg2+, it is also active in the presence of Co2+ or Mn2+ but exhibits a lower specific activity with these metal ions.

References

External links 
 

EC 3.1.3